Double Island Point is a coastal headland in Queensland, Australia.  It is the next headland north of Noosa and is within the Cooloola section of the Great Sandy National Park, at the southern end of Wide Bay. It is approximately 12km south along the beach from the tourist township of Rainbow Beach, Queensland.

History
The Kabi Kabi people have lived, hunted and fished in this area for tens of thousands of years. The site had obvious cultural significance and was used as a burial site by local indigenous people. 
The point was named by Captain Cook when he passed it on 18 May 1770, "on account of its figure" (i.e. shape).  In the original of his journal he had written Fiddle Head, but crossed that out.

Geography
Despite the name, there is no (double) islands, but rather a sandspit. It is the southern point of Wide Bay. Wolf Rock is a set of four volcanic pinnacles off Double Island Point.

There is no road access to the point, but four-wheel drive vehicles can go along the beach, either from the township of Rainbow Beach in Wide Bay, or the longer way up from Noosa Heads (after taking a ferry across the Noosa River).

The northern side of the point is a surfing location.  On a good swell, a right-hander breaks over sand, and for perhaps as much as 300 metres in ideal conditions.

Record Wind Gust
It was the highest non-tornadic wind gust ever recorded from a thunderstorm in Australia, and was equivalent to winds in a category 3 tropical cyclone.

Heritage listings
Double Island Point has a number of heritage-listed sites, including:
 Double Island Point: Double Island Point Light

Lighthouse

In 1884 a lighthouse was built on the point.  It is a timber with metal cladding construction, like many lighthouses in Queensland, made that way because it is cheaper than masonry, but also better suited for soft sandy soils.  It was planned for only halfway up the point, but then it was realized the light wouldn't be visible to the north and so the tower was built on top of the point.  The lantern was initially burning oil, then in 1923 vaporized kerosene was introduced. Later it was converted to electric power.  In 1992 it was converted to solar power and demanned. The light characteristic is a single flash every 7.5 seconds, the focal plane is located 96 metres above sea level.

See also

 Wolf Rock, just off the point
 Teewah Beach, stretches south from Double Island Point
 Rainbow Beach, stretches west from Double Island Point before turning north

References

Headlands of Queensland
Surfing locations in Queensland
Cooloola, Queensland